Kilde is a surname. Notable people with it include:

Aleksander Aamodt Kilde (born 1992), Norwegian alpine ski racer
Bent Kilde (born 1938), Danish field hockey player
Jeanne Halgren Kilde, American academic
Tollef Kilde (1853–1947), Norwegian forest owner, business founder, and politician